is a 1979 Japanese film directed by Satsuo Yamamoto.

Cast
 Shinobu Otake as Mine Masai
 Mieko Harada as Yuki Shinoda
 Chikako Yūri as Hana Mishima
 Yūko Kotegawa as Kiku Shoji
 Rentarō Mikuni as Tokichi Adachi

Plot
An indictment of the treatment of Meiji period silkworkers by their employers.

Production
The film was one of the last made by director Satsuo Yamamoto and was followed by a 1982 sequel, his final work, Nomugi Pass II (Ā, Nomugi tōge: Shinryoku hen).

Release
A roadshow version of the film was released in Japan on June 9, 1979 where it was distributed by Toho. It received a general release on June 30, 1979. The film was Toho's highest-grossing film of the year and was the second highest grossing among domestic releases.

The film was released in the United States with English-subtitles by Toho International on December 28, 1979.

Reception
In Japan, at the 34th Mainichi Film Awards, Nomugi Pass won the awards for Best Film, Best Cinematography, Best Art Direction and Best Score. At the Japanese Academy Awards, the film won the award for Best Sound, and Best Music Score (Masaru Sato).

Footnotes

References

External links 
 
 

1979 films
Films directed by Satsuo Yamamoto
1970s Japanese films
Films scored by Masaru Sato
Toho films
Films set in factories